Boord is a surname. Notable people with the surname include:

Ray Boord (1908–1982), New Zealand politician
Thomas Boord (1838–1912), British politician
Boord baronets, a title in the Baronetage of the United Kingdom created in 1896 for Thomas Boord